Earl Leishman Lindley (March 13, 1933 – February 14, 2012)  was a professional Canadian football player from 1954 to 1957. He participated in three Grey Cup victories in 1954, 1955 and 1956.  He played his college football at Utah State University, where he led all scorers in NCAA football in 1953, with 13 touchdowns and 3 extra points for a total of 81 points.

He was inducted into the Utah Sports Hall of Fame in 1986.

See also
 List of NCAA major college football yearly scoring leaders

References

External links

1933 births
2012 deaths
American players of Canadian football
Edmonton Elks players
People from Cache County, Utah
Players of American football from Utah
Utah State Aggies football players
Utah State Aggies men's basketball players
American men's basketball players